Daphnoretin is a protein kinase C activator isolated from Wikstroemia indica C.A. Mey, one of the 50 fundamental herbs in traditional Chinese medicine.
It has also been found to occur in Stellera chamaejasme - the single species in a genus closely related to Wikstroemia within the family Thymelaceae.

References

Wikstroemia
Coumarins
Protein kinase C activators
Resorcinol ethers